Cher's 3rd constituency is one of three French legislative constituencies in the department of Cher. It is currently represented by Loïc Kervran of Horizons.

Historic representation

Elections

2022 

 
 
 
 
 
|-
| colspan="8" bgcolor="#E9E9E9"|
|-

2017

2012

2007

 
 
 
 
 
 
 
 
|-
| colspan="8" bgcolor="#E9E9E9"|
|-

2002

 
 
 
 
 
 
 
|-
| colspan="8" bgcolor="#E9E9E9"|
|-

1997

References

External links 
Results of legislative elections from 2002 to 2017 by constituency (Ministry of the Interior) 
Results of legislative elections from 1958 to 2012 by constituency (CDSP Sciences Po) 
Results of elections from 1958 to present by constituency (data.gouv.fr) 

3